"Wake Up (Make a Move)" is the third single from Start Something, the second album by the Welsh rock band Lostprophets. "Wake Up (Make a Move)" was released to radio on 1 June 2004. This single was under much debate up to its release; both Lostprophets and their management wanted the dark, brooding "Make a Move" as a single, whereas the label wanted the poppier, catchier "I Don't Know". The band and their management walked away victorious and the song was released as a single with the modified title "Wake Up (Make a Move)". However, "I Don't Know" was later released for radio airplay in the U.S. and made it to #11 on Billboard's Alternative Songs chart.

A music video was produced for the song and saw moderate MTV airplay upon release.

Track listing

Personnel
 Ian Watkins – lead vocals
 Lee Gaze – lead guitar
 Mike Lewis – rhythm guitar
 Stuart Richardson – bass guitar
 Jamie Oliver – synth, turntables, samples, vocals
 Mike Chiplin – drums, percussion

Charts

Footnotes

External links
www.lostprophets.com

Lostprophets songs
2004 singles
Song recordings produced by Eric Valentine
2004 songs
Columbia Records singles
UK Independent Singles Chart number-one singles